Power-to-weight ratio (PWR, also called specific power, or power-to-mass ratio) is a calculation commonly applied to engines and mobile power sources to enable the comparison of one unit or design to another. Power-to-weight ratio is a measurement of actual performance of any engine or power source. It is also used as a measurement of performance of a vehicle as a whole, with the engine's power output being divided by the weight (or mass) of the vehicle, to give a metric that is independent of the vehicle's size. Power-to-weight is often quoted by manufacturers at the peak value, but the actual value may vary in use and variations will affect performance.

The inverse of power-to-weight, weight-to-power ratio (power loading) is a calculation commonly applied to aircraft, cars, and vehicles in general, to enable the comparison of one vehicle's performance to another. Power-to-weight ratio is equal to thrust per unit mass multiplied by the velocity of any vehicle.

Power-to-weight (specific power)
To see this, note that what an engineer means by the "power to weight ratio" of an electric motor is not infinite in a zero gravity environment.

Examples of high power-to-weight ratios can often be found in turbines. This is because of their ability to operate at very high speeds. For example, the Space Shuttle's main engines used turbopumps (machines consisting of a pump driven by a turbine engine) to feed the propellants (liquid oxygen and liquid hydrogen) into the engine's combustion chamber. The original liquid hydrogen turbopump is similar in size to an automobile engine (weighing approximately ) and produces  for a power-to-weight ratio of 153 kW/kg (93 hp/lb).

Physical interpretation
In classical mechanics, instantaneous power is the limiting value of the average work done per unit time as the time interval Δt approaches zero (i.e. the derivative with respect to time of the work done).

This fact allows one to express the power-to-weight ratio purely by SI base units. A vehicle's power-to-weight ratio equals its acceleration times its velocity; so at twice the velocity, it experiences half the acceleration, all else being equal.

Propulsive power
If the work to be done is rectilinear motion of a body with constant mass , whose center of mass is to be accelerated along a (possibly non-straight) to a speed  and angle  with respect to the centre and radial of a gravitational field by an onboard powerplant, then the associated kinetic energy is

where:
 is mass of the body
 is speed of the center of mass of the body, changing with time.

The work–energy principle states that the work done to the object over a period of time is equal to the difference in its total energy over that period of time, so the rate at which work is done is equal to the rate of change of the kinetic energy (in the absence of potential energy changes).

where:
 is acceleration of the center of mass of the body, changing with time.
 is linear force – or thrust – applied upon the center of mass of the body, changing with time.
 is velocity of the center of mass of the body, changing with time.
 is torque applied upon the center of mass of the body, changing with time.
 is angular velocity of the center of mass of the body, changing with time.

In propulsion, power is only delivered if the powerplant is in motion, and is transmitted to cause the body to be in motion. It is typically assumed here that mechanical transmission allows the powerplant to operate at peak output power. This assumption allows engine tuning to trade power band width and engine mass for transmission complexity and mass. Electric motors do not suffer from this tradeoff, instead trading their high torque for traction at low speed. The power advantage or power-to-weight ratio is then

where:
 is linear speed of the center of mass of the body.

Engine power
The useful power of an engine with shaft power output can be calculated using a dynamometer to measure torque and rotational speed, with maximum power reached when torque multiplied by rotational speed is a maximum. For jet engines the useful power is equal to the flight speed of the aircraft multiplied by the force, known as net thrust, required to make it go at that speed. It is used when calculating propulsive efficiency.

Examples

Engines

Heat engines and heat pumps
Thermal energy is made up from molecular kinetic energy and latent phase energy. Heat engines are able to convert thermal energy in the form of a temperature gradient between a hot source and a cold sink into other desirable mechanical work. Heat pumps take mechanical work to regenerate thermal energy in a temperature gradient. Standard definitions should be used when interpreting how the propulsive power of a jet or rocket engine is transferred to its vehicle.

Electric motors and electromotive generators
An electric motor uses electrical energy to provide mechanical work, usually through the interaction of a magnetic field and current-carrying conductors. By the interaction of mechanical work on an electrical conductor in a magnetic field, electrical energy can be generated.

Fluid engines and fluid pumps
Fluids (liquid and gas) can be used to transmit and/or store energy using pressure and other fluid properties. Hydraulic (liquid) and pneumatic (gas) engines convert fluid pressure into other desirable mechanical or electrical work. Fluid pumps convert mechanical or electrical work into movement or pressure changes of a fluid, or storage in a pressure vessel.

Thermoelectric generators and electrothermal actuators
A variety of effects can be harnessed to produce thermoelectricity, thermionic emission, pyroelectricity and piezoelectricity. Electrical resistance and ferromagnetism of materials can be harnessed to generate thermoacoustic energy from an electric current.

Electrochemical (galvanic) and electrostatic cell systems

(Closed cell) batteries
All electrochemical cell batteries deliver a changing voltage as their chemistry changes from "charged" to "discharged". A nominal output voltage and a cutoff voltage are typically specified for a battery by its manufacturer. The output voltage falls to the cutoff voltage when the battery becomes "discharged". The nominal output voltage is always less than the open-circuit voltage produced when the battery is "charged". The temperature of a battery can affect the power it can deliver, where lower temperatures reduce power. Total energy delivered from a single charge cycle is affected by both the battery temperature and the power it delivers. If the temperature lowers or the power demand increases, the total energy delivered at the point of "discharge" is also reduced.

Battery discharge profiles are often described in terms of a factor of battery capacity. For example, a battery with a nominal capacity quoted in ampere-hours (Ah) at a C/10 rated discharge current (derived in amperes) may safely provide a higher discharge current – and therefore higher power-to-weight ratio – but only with a lower energy capacity. Power-to-weight ratio for batteries is therefore less meaningful without reference to corresponding energy-to-weight ratio and cell temperature. This relationship is known as Peukert's law.

Electrostatic, electrolytic and electrochemical capacitors
Capacitors store electric charge onto two electrodes separated by an electric field semi-insulating (dielectric) medium. Electrostatic capacitors feature planar electrodes onto which electric charge accumulates. Electrolytic capacitors use a liquid electrolyte as one of the electrodes and the electric double layer effect upon the surface of the dielectric-electrolyte boundary to increase the amount of charge stored per unit volume. Electric double-layer capacitors extend both electrodes with a nanoporous material such as activated carbon to significantly increase the surface area upon which electric charge can accumulate, reducing the dielectric medium to nanopores and a very thin high permittivity separator.

While capacitors tend not to be as temperature sensitive as batteries, they are significantly capacity constrained and without the strength of chemical bonds suffer from self-discharge. Power-to-weight ratio of capacitors is usually higher than batteries because charge transport units within the cell are smaller (electrons rather than ions), however energy-to-weight ratio is conversely usually lower.

Fuel cell stacks and flow cell batteries
Fuel cells and flow cells, although perhaps using similar chemistry to batteries, do not contain the energy storage medium or fuel. With a continuous flow of fuel and oxidant, available fuel cells and flow cells continue to convert the energy storage medium into electric energy and waste products. Fuel cells distinctly contain a fixed electrolyte whereas flow cells also require a continuous flow of electrolyte. Flow cells typically have the fuel dissolved in the electrolyte.

Photovoltaics

Vehicles
Power-to-weight ratios for vehicles are usually calculated using curb weight (for cars) or wet weight (for motorcycles), that is, excluding weight of the driver and any cargo. This could be slightly misleading, especially with regard to motorcycles, where the driver might weigh 1/3 to 1/2 as much as the vehicle itself. In the sport of competitive cycling athlete's performance is increasingly being expressed in VAMs and thus as a power-to-weight ratio in W/kg. This can be measured through the use of a bicycle powermeter or calculated from measuring incline of a road climb and the rider's time to ascend it.

Locomotives
A locomotive generally must be heavy in order to develop enough adhesion on the rails to start a train. As the coefficient of friction between steel wheels and rails seldom exceeds 0.25 in most cases, improving a locomotive's power-to-weight ratio is often counterproductive. However, the choice of power transmission system, such as variable-frequency drive versus direct current drive, may support a higher power-to-weight ratio by better managing propulsion power.

Utility and practical vehicles
Most vehicles are designed to meet passenger comfort and cargo carrying requirements. Vehicle designs trade off power-to-weight ratio to increase comfort, cargo space, fuel economy, emissions control, energy security and endurance. Reduced drag and lower rolling resistance in a vehicle design can facilitate increased cargo space without increase in the (zero cargo) power-to-weight ratio. This increases the role flexibility of the vehicle. Energy security considerations can trade off power (typically decreased) and weight (typically increased), and therefore power-to-weight ratio, for fuel flexibility or drive-train hybridisation. Some utility and practical vehicle variants such as hot hatches and sports-utility vehicles reconfigure power (typically increased) and weight to provide the perception of sports car like performance or for other psychological benefit.

Notable low ratio

Common power

Performance luxury, roadsters and mild sports
Increased engine performance is a consideration, but also other features associated with luxury vehicles. Longitudinal engines are common. Bodies vary from hot hatches, sedans (saloons), coupés, convertibles and roadsters. Mid-range dual-sport and cruiser motorcycles tend to have similar power-to-weight ratios.

Sports vehicles
Power-to-weight ratio is an important vehicle characteristic that affects the acceleration of sports vehicles.

Early vehicles

Aircraft
Propeller aircraft depend on high power-to-weight ratio to generate sufficient thrust to achieve sustained flight, and then to fly fast.

Thrust-to-weight ratio

Jet aircraft produce thrust directly.

Human
Power-to-weight ratio is important in cycling, since it determines acceleration and the speed during hill climbs. Since a cyclist's power-to-weight output decreases with fatigue, it is normally discussed with relation to the length of time that he or she maintains that power. A professional cyclist can produce over 20 W/kg (0.012 hp/lb) as a 5-second maximum.

See also
 Energy density
 Engine power
 Propulsive efficiency
 Specific output
 Thrust-to-weight ratio
 Vehicular metrics
 von Kármán–Gabrielli diagram

References

External links
 Measurespeed.com - Power to Weight Ratio Calculator
 Power to Weight Ratio (PWR) Calculator

Mechanics
Power (physics)
Engineering ratios